Jagmal Singh was a sixteenth century Indian prince and court figure. He was the son of Maharana Udai Singh II and Rani Dheerbai Bhatiyani.

Biography
After the death of Udai Singh II his favorite wife, Dheerbai Bhatiyani, wanted Jagmal to succeed Maharana Udai Singh after his death even though he was not the eldest son. On his deathbed, Udai Singh II named Jagmal Singh as the next Maharana. Jagmal was to be crowned as Maharana of Udaipur in 1572; however, the nobles of the court instead crowned Maharana Pratap.

Jagmal left Mewar and went into the service of the Mughal Subedar in Ajmer, who gave him shelter. Later he met Akbar and was given the jagir of Jahazpur as a gift. Sometime before 1581, he married the daughter of Maharao Man Singh II of Sirohi and became the co-ruler of Sirohi in 1581. His brother-in-law Rao Surtran became his enemy after this. He was killed by Rao Hammirji of Chandana on 17 October 1583 at the Battle of Dattani.

References

Mewar dynasty
History of Udaipur
Indian royalty
16th-century Indian people
1583 deaths